Ralph Theodore Hjorth (26 July 1883 – 14 January 1970) was an Australian politician.

He was born in Melton to Danish-born farmer Anders Stenson and Annie Devanny. He became a farmer at Coimadai and then an undertaker and ironmonger at Bacchus Marsh. Around 1907 he married Mary Agnes Byron, with whom he had four children. In 1924 he was elected to the Victorian Legislative Assembly as the Labor member for Bulla. He transferred to Grant in 1927 but was defeated in 1932. Hjorth died in Melbourne in 1970.

References

1883 births
1970 deaths
Australian Labor Party members of the Parliament of Victoria
Members of the Victorian Legislative Assembly
20th-century Australian politicians
Australian people of Danish descent